Carychium hachijoensis is a species of very small air-breathing land snail, a terrestrial pulmonate gastropod mollusk in the family Ellobiidae. The distribution of Carychium minimum is at East-Asia, including Japan and Taiwan. The snail usually lives under fallen leaves.

References

Ellobiidae